Garden Farms is a census-designated place in San Luis Obispo County, California. The 2010 United States census reported Garden Farms's population was 386.

Garden Farms is a subdivision  located between Santa Margarita and Atascadero, California.

Geography
According to the United States Census Bureau, the CDP covers an area of 1.1 square miles (2.8 km2), all of it land.

History
Garden Farms was developed in 1918 on land purchased from Rancho Santa Margarita by Edward Gardner Lewis, who planned the farms  to supply produce to Atascadero. The recession after World War I intervened, and the plan failed.

Demographics

The 2010 United States Census reported that Garden Farms had a population of 386. The racial makeup of Garden Farms was 348 (90.2%) White, 2 (0.5%) African American, 2 (0.5%) Native American, 5 (1.3%) Asian, 0 (0.0%) Pacific Islander, 21 (5.4%) from other races, and 8 (2.1%) from two or more races. Hispanic or Latino of any race were 40 persons (10.4%).

The Census reported that 386 people (100% of the population) lived in households, 0 (0%) lived in non-institutionalized group quarters, and 0 (0%) were institutionalized.

There were 159 households, out of which 42 (26.4%) had children under the age of 18 living in them, 86 (54.1%) were opposite-sex married couples living together, 12 (7.5%) had a female householder with no husband present, 9 (5.7%) had a male householder with no wife present.  There were 8 (5.0%) unmarried opposite-sex partnerships, and 2 (1.3%) same-sex married couples or partnerships. 38 households (23.9%) were made up of individuals, and 10 (6.3%) had someone living alone who was 65 years of age or older. The average household size was 2.43.  There were 107 families (67.3% of all households); the average family size was 2.88.

The population was spread out, with 80 people (20.7%) under the age of 18, 22 people (5.7%) aged 18 to 24, 84 people (21.8%) aged 25 to 44, 154 people (39.9%) aged 45 to 64, and 46 people (11.9%) who were 65 years of age or older.  The median age was 45.7 years. For every 100 females, there were 88.3 males.  For every 100 females age 18 and over, there were 101.3 males.

The homeowner vacancy rate was 0%; the rental vacancy rate was 2.0%.  281 people (72.8% of the population) lived in owner-occupied housing units and 105 people (27.2%) lived in rental housing units.

References

External links
History of Garden Farms, Santa Margarita Historical Society

Census-designated places in San Luis Obispo County, California
Census-designated places in California